Satyawati College is a constituent college of the University of Delhi, in New Delhi, India. It offers both morning and evening classes to a student base of almost 3000, with a permanent teaching staff of around 150. This college comes under North Campus.

History
The college was established in 1972 by the Government of Delhi, while "Evening college" was established in 1973. It is one of the constituent colleges of Delhi University  in the North campus in Phase III, Ashok Vihar, Delhi. The college is named after Satyavati Devi, a poet and a participant of Indian freedom movement.College have many active societies like Abhivyakti the Debating society. The current president of Abhivyakti is Yuddhveer Singh , a student hailing from Balia (U.P.)

About
The college is now approved on the North campus of University of Delhi and is near to many colleges like SRCC College, Hansraj College, Kirori Mal College etc. Courses covered include B.Com. (Hons.), B.Com. Prog, B.A (Hons.) Economics, History, Political Science and B.Sc. Mathematics etc. Satyawati College is maintained by Delhi Government as well as by Delhi University. The college is also equipped with a Pollution Level Display within its campus.

Notable alumni
Manoj Bajpayee
Amit Bhadana
Anil Jha Vats
Janhavi Panwar (Wonder Girl of India)
Siddhant Sarang

Academics

Academic programmes 
Humanities
Commerce
Bachelor's degree in mathematics
Certificate/diploma courses in German and French are offered

References

Universities and colleges in Delhi
Delhi University
North West Delhi district
Educational institutions established in 1972
1972 establishments in Delhi